Patrick C. Delap (17 March 1932 – 14 May 1987) was an Irish Fianna Fáil politician and medical doctor. He was first elected to Dáil Éireann at a 1970 by-election as a Fianna Fáil Teachta Dála (TD) for Donegal–Leitrim. The by-election was caused by the death of the Fine Gael TD Patrick O'Donnell.

He served for three years before he lost his seat at the 1973 general election. He stood again for the Dáil at the 1977 general election but was not elected.

References

1932 births
1987 deaths
Fianna Fáil TDs
Members of the 19th Dáil
Politicians from County Donegal
20th-century Irish medical doctors